Elachista citrina is a moth of the family Elachistidae that is found in Australia.

References

External links

Moths described in 2011
Endemic fauna of Australia
citrina
Moths of Australia